William Mathers Jack, OBE (1 May 189014 September 1982), known as "Silent Billy", was an Australian politician. Born in Dundee in Scotland, where he became an apprentice grocer at the age of 14, he migrated to Australia in 1912. After arrival in Australia, Jack became a grocer and businessman in North Sydney, and was elected to Willoughby Council.

In 1949, he was elected to the Australian House of Representatives as the Liberal member for North Sydney, a position he held until his retirement in 1966. During his parliamentary service, Jack earned the sobriquet "Silent Billy" because he only made five speeches in the House in 17 years, including his maiden and farewell speeches.

On 29 August 1962, he commenced his first speech in seven years with the words: I can remain silent no longer.

However, he was a very popular local member, noted for his strong constituent service, and retired without having lost an election.  In the New Year Honours of 1968, he was appointed an Officer of the Order of the British Empire for services to the Parliament and the community.

Jack died in 1982.

References

Liberal Party of Australia members of the Parliament of Australia
Members of the Australian House of Representatives for North Sydney
Members of the Australian House of Representatives
Australian Officers of the Order of the British Empire
1892 births
1982 deaths
People from Dundee
British emigrants to Australia
Politicians from Dundee
20th-century Australian politicians